Pylkiy (lit. "ardent"; alternate spellings Pylky) can refer to a number of Soviet destroyers:

, a Soviet Navy , former . She was acquired in 1945 and broken up in 1958.
She was launched in 1952 and decommissioned in 1964. Transferred to Indonesian Navy as KRI Diponegoro (306).

Soviet Navy ship names